Gundrevula is a large village located in C.Belagal Mandal of Kurnool district, Andhra Pradesh with total 1137 families residing. The Gundrevula village has population of 5014 of which 2561 are males while 2453 are females as per Population Census 2011. 

In Gundrevula village population of children with age 0-6 is 839 which makes up 16.73 % of total population of village. Average Sex Ratio of Gundrevula village is 958 which is lower than Andhra Pradesh state average of 993. Child Sex Ratio for the Gundrevula as per census is 924, lower than Andhra Pradesh average of 939. 

Gundrevula village has lower literacy rate compared to Andhra Pradesh. In 2011, literacy rate of Gundrevula village was 44.22 % compared to 67.02 % of Andhra Pradesh. In Gundrevula Male literacy stands at 56.28 % while female literacy rate was 31.71 %. 

As per constitution of India and Panchyati Raaj Act, Gundrevula village is administrated by Sarpanch (Head of Village) who is elected representative of village.

References
Villages in Kurnool district
http://www.census2011.co.in/data/village/593864-gundrevula-andhra-pradesh.html